{|
{{Infobox ship image
|Ship image= NATO Research vessel Alliance.jpg
|Ship image size= 300px
|Ship caption=Alliance' at La Spezia
}}

|}Alliance (A5345) is a research vessel owned by NATO and operated by the Marina Militare as a NATO research vessel and owned by the CMRE – Centre for Maritime Research and Experimentation, in La Spezia, Italy. Alliance has the status of an auxiliary ship of the Marina Militare.

The function of the Alliance is to conduct a wide range of acoustic, oceanographic research and engineering technology tasks on behalf of NATO, Marina Militare and third party organizations when 'on hire' for charters in global waters. The design and construction of the vessel was done to create a versatile research platform that is adaptable to the Centre's needs and reduce noise output to the lowest possible level in order to minimize interference with research work.

 History 
Commissioned on 15 April 1988 to SACLANT (Undersea Research Centre – SACLANTCEN, then named NATO Underwater Research Centre – NURC and now CMRE – Centre for Maritime Research and Experimentation) of La Spezia, under the German flag.Alliance'' was transferred to the Italian naval flag on 9 April 2016. The vessel is crewed and operated on behalf of NATO by the Marina Militare under a Memorandum of Understanding signed on 22 December 2015.

General information 
Source:
 primary working area (aft): 
 secondary working area (forward): 
 maintenance, support and all Labs: 
 scientific storage areas: 500 m3
 capacity to embark up to 5 standard ISO1C, and up to 3 standard ISO 1D, containers

Sensing devices 
 multibeam echo sounder Kongsberg SIMRAD EM-302, 30 kHz
 echo sounder Atlas Deso 30, 33 kHz 
 echo sounder Atlas deso 25, 210 kHz 
 echo sounder FWC, 100 kHz
 SMS Sound Velocity Probe C Sonde SVP 10
 acoustic tracking system
 E.M. Speed Log Skipper DL850, 270 kHz
 Acoustic Range and Bearing Indicator, 9–11 kHz
 Acoustic Doppler Current Profiler (ADCP) RDI, 75 kHz
 Conductivity/temperature sensor Sea Bird, 8–12 kHz
 Underwater telephone ELAC LAZ5100 , 8-11.5 kHz

Communication systems 
There are two independent systems for ship communications and for scientific trials (with some overlap).
The ship system, which uses radios complying with SOLAS and GMDSS rules, includes Inmarsat systems (e-mail, fax and phone).
 2 x Elmer ST-1075, 1000 watt HF transmitter
 2 x Elmer ST-675, 600 watt HF transmitter
 2 x Elmer SRT-619, UHF transceiver
 Sailor RT144C, VHF transceiver
 Furuno FM-2510, VHF transceiver
 Kelvin Hughes Band V-Sat SATCOM, Satellite Communication System

See also 
 
 ROCS Ta Kuan (AGS-1601)

References

External links 

Auxiliary ships of the Italian Navy
1986 ships
Ships built in Italy
Ships built by Fincantieri
Research vessels